Voce is a surname. Notable people with the surname include:

Amy Voce, English radio presenter
Bill Voce (1909–1984), English cricketer
Steve Voce (born 1933), British journalist
Lello Voce (born 1957), Italian poet
Vincenzo Voce (born 1962), Italian politician
John Voce (born 1963), English actor
Gary Voce (born 1965), American NBA player
Tony Voce (born 1980), American ice hockey player
Luna Voce (born 1988), Dutch-Italian model